Kladje is a dispersed settlement at an elevation of 787 meters above sea level above the right bank of the upper course of the Poljane Sora River in the Municipality of Gorenja Vas–Poljane in the Upper Carniola region of Slovenia.

References

External links 
Kladje on Geopedia

Populated places in the Municipality of Gorenja vas-Poljane